The New Zealand Rugby Museum, based in Palmerston North, New Zealand, is a museum dedicated to the sport of Rugby union. Founded by John Sinclair and modeled after the Trophy Room in Cardiff Arms Park in Wales, the museum's collections include equipment, clothing, books, photographs, trophies, badges and almost everything else related to the game.   Until his death in 2012, Wilson Whineray was the museum's patron while Stephen Berg is the full-time director.

The museum moved into larger premises adjacent to the Civic Centre and Te Manawa cultural complex prior to the Rugby World Cup 2011. The Museum was part of the REAL New Zealand Festival, a series of cultural events and activities coordinated with the hosting of the Cup. A handful of the approximately 50,000 holdings are contributed to NZMuseums, the combined catalog of museums across New Zealand. As well as collecting objects connected to key historic matches, the museum also loans particular items for particular uses.

The museum is managed by the Rugby Museum Society of New Zealand, a registered charity and Associate Member of the New Zealand Rugby Union.

References

External links 

 

Culture in Palmerston North
Sports museums in New Zealand
Rugby union in New Zealand
Museums in Manawatū-Whanganui
Rugby union museums and halls of fame
Sport in Palmerston North